The 164th Massachusetts General Court, consisting of the Massachusetts Senate and the Massachusetts House of Representatives, met in 1965 and 1966 during the governorship of John Volpe. Maurice A. Donahue served as president of the Senate and John Davoren served as speaker of the House. On April 22, 1965, Rev. Martin Luther King Jr. delivered an address to a joint session of the General Court after meeting with Massachusetts Governor John Volpe. In the same month, Volpe filed a request for legislation from the state legislature that defined schools with nonwhite enrollments greater than 50 percent to be imbalanced and granted the State Board of Education the power to withhold state funds from any school district in the state that was found to have racial imbalance, which Volpe would sign into law the following August.

Senators

Representatives

See also
 89th United States Congress
 List of Massachusetts General Courts

References

Further reading

External links
 
 
 
 
  (1964-1994)

Political history of Massachusetts
Massachusetts legislative sessions
massachusetts
1965 in Massachusetts
massachusetts
1966 in Massachusetts